Daddy...Daddy is a 1998  Indian Telugu-language comedy film, Produced by Ramoji Rao under the Usha Kiran Movies banner and directed by Kodi Ramakrishna. It stars Akkineni Nageswara Rao, Jayasudha, Harish, Raasi  and music composed by Vandemataram Srinivas. The film is Akkineni Nageswara Rao's 250th movie. It is a remake of blockbuster Tamil film  Once More (1997). The film was a box office success.

Plot
The film begins with Prasad (Harish) a man born with a golden spoon whose father always stays abroad and the only companion he has is his cousin Anji (Ali). Prasad oversees his father's business and fed up with the high-profile lifestyle & busy schedules want to live like a normal person. He loves a charming girl Subhadra (Raasi) but misjudging him as a materialistic she refuses. On the other side, Apco / Appala Konda (Sivaji Rao) a crafty person, aspires to marry Subhadra widens the gap between the two. Meanwhile, Prasad's father dies in a flight crash and the entire business is about to bankrupt. Just before, Prasad gets a glow that his father has secured a huge amount in a bank but to acquire it his father's signature is compulsory when Prasad & Anji plan to pose someone as his father and pick it up. Now, Anand Rao (Akkineni Nageswara Rao) a multi-millionaire lands in the city, once for chucklesome he disguises himself as a fruit seller when Prasad meets & expresses to him the plight and Anand Rao also learns due to the deception of his office staff Prasad has been bankrupted. Hence, he accepts to act as his father as remorse, thereupon, Anand Rao cleverly throws Prasad out of his turbulence and even resolves his love affair with Subhadra. After some time, Anand Rao affirms the truth when Prasad asks him to be his father forever and he heartfully embraces him. Right now, surprisingly, Sarada (Jayasudha) the wife of Anand Rao who has discarded him years ago due to the misunderstandings returns. Being cognizant of their past, Prasad & Subhadra decides to unite them but unfortunately, the clashes arise between the two as they support each of them. Exploiting the situation, Apco aggravates the rift and ploys to marry Subhadra. Here Anand Rao again makes a comic play proclaims the facts when Sarada also realizes her mistake. Finally, the movie ends on a happy note with the marriage of Prasad & Subhadra.

Cast

Akkineni Nageswara Rao as Anand Rao 
Jayasudha as Sarada 
Harish as Prasad
Raasi as Subhadra / Subbu
Ravali as Rajani
Ali as Anji
Costume Krishna
Raghunath Reddy
Sivaji Raja as Apco / Appala Konda 
L. B. Sriram
Gundu Hanumantha Rao
Ananth 
Chitti Babu
Gautham Raju
K. K. Sarma
Mithai Chitti
Satti Babu

Soundtrack

Music composed by Vandemataram Srinivas. Music released on Mayuri Audio Company.

References

External links 

Indian comedy films
Films directed by Kodi Ramakrishna
Films scored by Vandemataram Srinivas
1998 comedy films
1998 films
Telugu remakes of Tamil films
1990s Telugu-language films